The Daytona 300, currently known for sponsorship reasons as the Beef. It's What's for Dinner. 300 (often shortened to Beef 300 in the media), is the first race of the NASCAR Xfinity Series season,  held at Daytona International Speedway. It is held the day before the Daytona 500, and is considered the most prestigious event of the Xfinity Series. Until 2002, it was the only event of the Xfinity Series to be annually held at Daytona International Speedway. Austin Hill won the most recent race, in 2023.

History
The race originates from races held at the Daytona Beach Road Course during the 1948 NASCAR Modified series season, the first sanctioned races held by the organization. Between 1950 and 1958, the race was held as part of the Modified/Sportsman Series, at the Daytona Beach Road Course. It was held the Friday or Saturday before the track's Grand National Series race.

In 1956–1959, a race in the short-lived NASCAR Convertible Division was also held.

The race moved to the new 2.5-mile Daytona International Speedway for 1959. It was scheduled the day before the Daytona 500, and ran a distance of either 200 or 250 miles. In 1966, the race became known as the Permatex 300, making it only the second race on the NASCAR schedule to be named for a corporate sponsor (the Motor Trend 500 at Riverside being the first). In 1968 the Permatex 300 was shifted from the Modifieds division to the newly organized NASCAR Late Model Sportsman Division. In 1982, the Late Model Sportsman Division was reorganized into the modern day NASCAR Xfinity Series, and the race was sponsored by Goody's for several years.

Incidents
In the 1970s and early 1980s, the race was often ridiculed and exploited by local media for its frequent crashes and massive pileups. Several major accidents and fires over the years were blamed on the low level of experience by several of the drivers, and the older equipment used. The level of prestige held by the event, along with the relatively large purses, attracted numerous independent and one-off entries, contributing to the inexperience of drivers in the field.

By the time the race had become part of a NASCAR touring series race, NASCAR tightened driver eligibility requirements, and the number of incidents has drastically been reduced.  Under current NASCAR rules, drivers must be cleared to race at Daytona and Talladega (added to the second tier series in 1992), requiring enough experience at intermediate tracks to be cleared by NASCAR to participate at Daytona.  Drivers who intend to run the 300 or the Truck Series NextEra Energy 250 will enter other lower-tier shorter support races, whether it was the former Dash Series race (which ended after 2004—it used less powerful cars) or until 2020, the ARCA race the week prior to gain NASCAR clearance, especially if a driver has turned 18 after the preceding October Talladega Camping World Truck Series race (the ARCA race was moved to the Xfinity race day in 2021).  NASCAR will also require the driver first test in the January ARCA test at Daytona if they will turn 18 prior to the ARCA race or any national series race they intend to enter at Daytona or Talladega during a season before they are allowed to participate in an ARCA, Truck, or Xfinity race at either circuit and there are no intermediate tracks beforehand.  (Drivers must be 18 to participate in any NASCAR national series race on a track 1.366 miles or longer;  16 and 17 year old drivers may enter a Truck race on shorter tracks.)

Inclement weather also plagued many early runnings.

The 1960 race is notable for having the largest pileup in NASCAR history. On the first lap, 37 cars crashed in turn four (out of a starting field of 68).

In 1981 and 2004, the race started on Saturday, but was halted by rain, and finished Monday, the day after the Daytona 500. The 1969 race was red flagged three times for rain and also saw the fatal crash involving Don MacTavish, which his whole front of the car ripped off.

The 1979 running was shortened by rain and won by Darrell Waltrip.  A brutal crash erupted off Turn Two where fire exploded from the Preacher Cox Mercury of Joe Frasson; driver Don Williams was gravely injured in the crash and would die ten years later from the incident.

The 2013 race featured two large accidents. With five laps remaining, Michael Annett and Austin Dillon collided and a multi-car crash erupted in the first turn. The race was halted as a red flag was given to clean up the debris. Annett was hospitalized overnight after sustaining bruises on his chest, but was released the following day in time for the Daytona 500, but was ruled out for the following race at Phoenix because of a sternum injury. Following the red flag the race had two laps remaining. Regan Smith and Brad Keselowski moved into the lead on the final lap, but off the fourth turn, Keselowski turned Smith into the wall head on, causing the field to pile in. Kyle Larson had the most significant impact, as his No.32 Chevrolet flew into the tri-oval catch fence, causing its nose to snag a crossover gate, which tore open. The force of the collision dug the engine in, ripping it out of the car. The car's entire front half disintegrated and one front wheel lodged onto the engine and another flew approximately ten rows into the grandstand, injuring 30 spectators (two in critical condition). A total of twelve cars were involved in the crash, but all were unharmed. The two spectators that were seriously injured by the debris from Larson's crash were treated at the nearby Halifax Medical Center and were later released.

In 2015, two cautions in the final forty laps were caused by separate collisions that included eleven cars. In the first collision, Regan Smith's car flipped over once in the tri-oval, while in the second collision, Kyle Busch collided into a concrete wall head on, suffering a fracture in his leg and foot. As a result of his injuries, Busch was forced to miss the first 11 races of the Sprint Cup Series season however he would still manage to win the season championship.

The 2018 race produced the closest finish in any of NASCAR's top three series, when Tyler Reddick edged Elliott Sadler by 0.0004 seconds, making it the closest finish in NASCAR history. Since NASCAR scoring and timing does not measure beyond thousands of a second, the margin of victory was officially listed as 0.000 seconds (with video review which declared Reddick the winner by less than three inches). Analysis after the race by NASCAR timing and scoring officials placed Reddick's margin of victory at 0.0004 seconds. This race also had a record five overtime finishes, extending the race length to 143 laps.

On the final lap of the 2022 Beef. It's What's For Dinner 300, Myatt Snider flipped into the catchfence coming into turn 3 at Daytona International Speedway on February 19, 2022. The driver of the 31 TaxSlayer Chevy walked away from the crash. This gave former NASCAR Camping World Truck Series driver Austin Hill his first career NASCAR Xfinity Series win.

Participation by Cup Series drivers
Since its inception, due to its prestige and prominent position on the Speedweeks calendar, the race has long attracted NASCAR Cup Series regulars.  NASCAR Cup Series regulars have dominated the race since 1981, winning all but nine runnings. Notable Cup regulars who have won the race multiple times include Dale Earnhardt (7 wins), Tony Stewart (7), Darrell Waltrip (5), and Dale Earnhardt Jr. (3).

On four occasions, the driver of the race has gone on to win the Daytona 500, which is typically run on the following day: Bobby Allison (1988), Darrell Waltrip (1989), Dale Earnhardt Jr. (2004), Kevin Harvick (2007).

Because of current NASCAR rules, Cup driver participation has been reduced drastically.  A five-race limit per year is in effect, and drivers would want to participate in events that would help them at certain circuits or sponsor's requests.  Furthermore, after Kyle Busch's injuries from the 2015 crash, most teams do not want Cup drivers in the Xfinity race at Daytona (they are prohibited from both Talladega races because of bonus race rules in the spring and playoff races in the fall).  The last Cup driver to win this race was Chase Elliott in 2016, a Cup Series rookie at the time.

Past winners

Daytona Beach Road Course

1955: Shortened from 125 kilometers (77.9 miles) due to a large crash and fire on the 17th lap which injured 3 drivers and 3 spectators.

Daytona International Speedway

Notes
1964: Race shortened due to late start caused by three-hour rain delay..
1974: Race scheduled for 108 laps (270 miles) due to energy crisis.
1979: Race shortened due to rain.
1981 and 2004: Races postponed from Saturday to Monday due to rain.
2014, 2017, 2018, 2021 and 2023: Races extended due to NASCAR overtime.

Multiple winners (drivers)

Multiple winners (teams)

Manufacturer wins

See also
Daytona 500
NextEra Energy 250

References

External links
 

1959 establishments in Florida
NASCAR Xfinity Series races
 
Recurring sporting events established in 1959
Annual sporting events in the United States